Thorpe on the Hill may refer to:

 Thorpe on the Hill, Lincolnshire, England
 Thorpe on the Hill, West Yorkshire, England